Holden Heights is a census-designated place and unincorporated area in Orange County, Florida, United States. The population was 3,679 at the 2010 census. The ZIP code serving the CDP is 32839. It is part of the Orlando–Kissimmee Metropolitan Statistical Area.

Geography
Holden Heights is located at  (28.501031, -81.385593), or approximately two miles SSW of Orlando.

Demographics

As of the census of 2000, there were 3,856 people, 1,391 households, and 950 families residing in the CDP.  The population density was 1,172.3/km2 (3,030.0/mi2).  There were 1,631 housing units at an average density of 495.9/km2 (1,281.6/mi2).  The racial makeup of the CDP was 72.77% White, 17.27% African American, 0.31% Native American, 2.62% Asian, 0.18% Pacific Islander, 4.02% from other races, and 2.83% from two or more races. Hispanic or Latino of any race were 14.68% of the population.

There were 1,391 households, out of which 26.8% had children under the age of 18 living with them, 49.7% were married couples living together, 12.9% had a female householder with no husband present, and 31.7% were non-families. 20.9% of all households were made up of individuals, and 6.1% had someone living alone who was 65 years of age or older.  The average household size was 2.55 and the average family size was 2.91.

In the CDP, the population was spread out, with 19.7% under the age of 18, 6.5% from 18 to 24, 31.8% from 25 to 44, 24.0% from 45 to 64, and 18.0% who were 65 years of age or older.  The median age was 40 years. For every 100 females, there were 101.7 males.  For every 100 females age 18 and over, there were 99.8 males.

The median income for a household in the CDP was $46,950, and the median income for a family was $48,693. Males had a median income of $30,731 versus $28,707 for females. The per capita income for the CDP was $20,761.  About 12.6% of families and 16.6% of the population were below the poverty line, including 28.3% of those under age 18 and 2.6% of those age 65 or over.

Population history 
1970.....6,206
1980....13,864 (Z)
1990.....4,387
2000.....3,856
2010.....3,679

(Z): Parts of community annexed by Orlando in the 1980s.

Source: U.S. Census Bureau

References

Unincorporated communities in Orange County, Florida
Census-designated places in Orange County, Florida
Greater Orlando
Census-designated places in Florida
Unincorporated communities in Florida
Neighborhoods in Orlando, Florida